Marci Dale Harris (born December 22, 1974) is an American lawyer, entrepreneur, and a congressional staffer. She is known for being the CEO and co-founder of PopVox, an online platform that connects voters with lawmakers. Harris lives in San Francisco, California, but she is originally from West Tennessee. She had started the PopVox website from her experiences as a congressional staffer, with the goal of making the government more accessible to the average voter.

Early life 
Harris was born in Tennessee and attended the Lausanne Collegiate School, also known as the Lausanne Collegiate School for Girls, which is an independent, nonsectarian school for children in kindergarten through twelfth grade in Memphis.  She comes from a long line of entrepreneurs, with her grandma taking over the local funeral parlor the family ran after her grandfather passed away, a radical move at the time. Her father started a real estate company, and Marci grew up with business being a dominant family conversation. Politics was also a highly contested issue in Harris's family with her father being a strong Republican and her mother being Democratic. Harris traveled much during her childhood and teen years. She was a sophomore in high school when she moved to Australia for six months in 1991, returning to Memphis to finish her senior year of high school. She then traveled to Paraguay before deciding to go to the Franklin School in Switzerland for college between 1993 and 1997.

Career

2007–2010: Congress 
After receiving a J.D. degree at the University of Memphis and then a master of law at the American University in 2007, Harris went on to work in Congress as a congressional staffer for three years, focusing on issues of health care reform, medicare, waste fraud, and abuse. She first entered the congressional arena when she became the Tax, Trade, and Health Counsel to Pete Stark, and oversaw the Ways and Means Health Subcommittee in the areas of Medicare program integrity and transparency issues. In her time at Congress, Harris was under President Barack Obama.

2010–present: Popvox 
It was during her time working for Stark that Harris got her idea for Popvox, noticing that Congress oftentimes received much input from the public, but oftentimes failed to organize it efficiently enough to employ it constructively. After leaving the hill in 2010, Marci went on to co-found PopVox with UCLA alum Radha Chaudhry along with the help of other civic tech enthusiasts. The website contains a plethora of public information about bills that are introduced in Congress. Advocacy organizations can register for a profile on the website and include their positions on certain bills, stating whether they support them or oppose them. The website gained rapid traction, going on to win the SxSW BizSpark Accelerator startup competition in 2011 and was named one of the Top Open Government Websites by Read Write Web.

In addition to running PopVox, Marci currently serves on the board of LaunchTN, which is a public-private partnership aimed at fostering entrepreneurship among high-growth companies in her home town in Tennessee. Additionally, she mentors at Code for America Accelerator in San Francisco, California. For her main project, PopVox, Harris has goals of testing out a pilot platform at state levels for the website to integrate from federal to state level. She plans on traveling throughout the country to speak about the PopVox and its goals, and her next stops are Knoxville, Chattanooga, Nashville, and Jackson, finally ending her tour in Memphis.

Harris's views on civic-technology 
In a 2014 interview with TechPresident reporter Sonia Roubini, Harris described her views on civic technology's role in future political participation, stating, "transparency, government technology, and civic engagement are different and complementary things that require different approaches and different expertise". Harris's statement reveals her belief in the distinction between technology and government as two sides of the same coin, noting instead that technology is a tool and asset that should be used to further open government. She used her own platform as an example of this idea, and said, "The true power of Popvox is not its technology, however. It is in the voices of people sharing their personal stories with their elected representatives."

Personal life 
Harris currently resides in San Francisco, California, where her main priority is carrying out her duties as CEO of Popvox. She has employed the help of her brother, who serves as COO of the website.

References

American women chief executives
American technology chief executives
University of Memphis alumni
Washington College of Law alumni
People from Tennessee
Living people
1974 births
21st-century American women